Thornton Creek is  of urban creeks and tributaries from southeast Shoreline through northeast Seattle to Lake Washington.  Its  watershed, the largest in Seattle, exhibits relatively dense biodiversity for an urban setting; it is home to frogs, newts, ducks, herons, and beavers, in addition to more than 75,000 people. From west of Jackson Park Golf Course in Shoreline, from Sunny Walter-Pillings Pond in Licton Springs–North College Park, and north Northgate Thornton Creek flows through Maple Leaf and Lake City, including the Victory Heights, Meadowbrook, and Matthews Beach neighborhoods, and empties into the lake at Matthews Beach Park.

Habitat and stewardship 
Thornton Creek flows through Meadowbrook Pond, known for its birdwatching and resident beavers. The Thornton creek watershed is land formerly inhabited by the Duwamish tribe. One of the Duwamish's historic longhouse sites was located near the mouth of Thornton Creek at Mathews beach.
Early in the 1900s, the creek contained dense runs of at least five species of Pacific salmon and trout, today only a few Kokanee still travel up stream.  The areas surrounding the creek were developed without regard for that habitat and the riparian corridor; species' diversity declined, and the creek became a typical degraded urban watershed.  Storm water retention, sites restoration, an Environmental Learning Center next to a school, and a fish ladder contributed to restoration and the return of native plants and wildlife. Thornton creek is home to many native species, muskrats, beavers, otters, bats, crayfish and coyotes, and in addition is an important breeding ground for great blue herons. Common for urban creeks, there are also many problematic invasive species like Japanese knotweed, black rats and New Zealand mud snails.

Thornton Creek Water Quality Channel 
For many decades, much of the stream has run through culverts, notably under the parking lot of Northgate Mall.  Building on gradual successes in restoration, activist neighbors began working with the City of Seattle and developers toward daylighting parts of the buried creek.

In 2004, the City of Seattle purchased the  parking lot from Northgate Mall and began building the Thornton Creek Water Quality Channel. Opened in 2009, it achieved several community goals in limited space: integrating a water-quality facility, providing a diverse housing mix, and allowing public open space.

Organizations of citizens have cleaned up nearby wetlands, educated the public about stream health and quality of neighborhood life, and rallied to bring more of the creek to daylight.  Many restoration projects in Seattle have been in some way connected to or inspired by Thornton Creek.

Neighborhoods of the Thornton Creek watershed 

Southeast neighborhoods of the city of Shoreline, north fork headwaters
Lake City neighborhoods
Olympic Hills
Victory Heights
Meadowbrook, confluence of forks
Matthews Beach
Northgate neighborhoods
Pinehurst
Licton Springs–North College Park, south fork headwaters
Maple Leaf
Northgate Mall

See also 
 List of rivers of Washington
 Daylighting (streams)
 Neighborhoods of Ravenna Creek
 Water resources
 Boeing Creek
 Ravenna Creek
 Yesler Creek

References

Bibliography 

   Elise Bowditch, Teaching Assistant; Man Wang, Teaching Assistant; Matthew W. Wilson, Research Associate.
 
  
 
   Was , NF.
 
 
 
   Archive of The Seattle Press.
   History excerpted from Morgan, Brandt. Enjoying Seattle's parks. Seattle: Greenwood Publications, 1979. 
 
  
 
 
   Viewing locations only; the book has walks, hikes, wildlife, and natural wonders.  Walter excerpted from
   "with additions by Sunny Walter and local Audubon chapters."  See "Northeast Seattle" section, bullet points "Meadowbrook", "Paramount Park Open Space", "North Seattle Community College Wetlands", and "Sunny Walter -- Twin Ponds".

Further reading 
"Thornton Creek Alliance"
"Homewaters Project"
"Thornton Creek Watershed", the Homewaters Project
 Thornton Creek Watershed "Community Library"

External links

 Thornton Creek webcam

Rivers of Washington (state)
Landforms of Seattle
Shoreline, Washington
Subterranean rivers of the United States
Rivers of King County, Washington